The 2016 Kunming Open was a professional tennis tournament played on outdoor clay courts. It was the fifth edition for men and third edition for women of the tournament and part of the 2016 ATP Challenger Tour and the 2016 ITF Women's Circuit, offering a total of $100,000 for men and women in prize money. It took place in Anning, China, between 25 April–1 May for men and 2–8 May 2016 for women.

Men's singles main draw entrants

Seeds 

 1 Rankings as of 18 April 2016

Other entrants 
The following players received wildcards into the singles main draw:
  Xia Zihao
  He Yecong
  Te Rigele
  Ouyang Bowen

The following players received entry from the qualifying draw:
  Yoshihito Nishioka
  Yannick Hanfmann 
  Matt Reid
  Greg Jones

Women's singles main draw entrants

Seeds 

 1 Rankings as of 25 April 2016

Other entrants 
The following players received wildcards into the singles main draw:
  Peng Shuai
  Xun Fangying
  Zhang Shuai
  Zhao Di

The following players received entry from the qualifying draw:
  Gai Ao
  Guo Shanshan
  Harmony Tan
  Ye Qiuyu

Champions

Men's singles

 Jordan Thompson def.  Mathias Bourgue, 6–3, 6–2

Women's singles

 Zhang Kailin def.  Peng Shuai, 6–1, 0–6, 4–2, retired

Men's doubles

 Bai Yan /  Riccardo Ghedin def.  Denys Molchanov /  Aleksandr Nedovyesov, 4–6, 6–3, [10–6]

Women's doubles

  Wang Yafan /  Zhang Kailin def.  Varatchaya Wongteanchai /  Yang Zhaoxuan, 6–7(3–7), 7–6(7–2), [10–1]

External links 
 2016 ITF Women's Circuit – Anning at ITFtennis.com

2016 ITF Women's Circuit
China International Challenger
2016
2016 in Chinese tennis